The 2013 Newfoundland and Labrador Tankard, the men's provincial curling championship for Newfoundland and Labrador, was held from February 5 to 10 at the RE/MAX Centre in St. John's, Newfoundland and Labrador. The winning team of Brad Gushue will represent Newfoundland and Labrador at the 2013 Tim Hortons Brier in Edmonton, Alberta.

Teams

Standings

*One game was allowed to result in a tie.

Round-robin results
All draw times are listed in Newfoundland Standard Time (UTC−3:30).

Draw 1
Tuesday, February 5, 7:00 pm

Draw 2
Wednesday, February 6, 2:00 pm

Draw 3
Wednesday, February 6, 7:00 pm

Draw 4
Thursday, February 7, 9:00 am

Draw 5
Thursday, February 7, 3:00 pm

Draw 6
Friday, February 8, 9:00 am

Draw 7
Friday, February 8, 2:00 pm

Playoffs

1 vs. 2
Saturday, February 9, 2:00 pm

3 vs. 4
Saturday, February 9, 2:00 pm

Semifinal
Saturday, February 9, 7:00 pm

Final
Sunday, February 10, 1:00 pm

References

External links

2013 Tim Hortons Brier
Sport in St. John's, Newfoundland and Labrador
Curling in Newfoundland and Labrador